SKEMA Business School (School of Knowledge Economy and Management) is a French business school, devoted to higher education and research. It has the legal status of a non-profit association under the French "1901 law". The Lille school was founded in 1892 and CERAM in 1963.
It offers programmes such as a BBA in Global Management, Master of Science (MS and MSc), EMBA, doctoral equivalences and executive education programs in France, Brazil, China, and the US.

SKEMA Business School was recently rated by the  Financial Times and The Economist as one of the top business schools in continental Europe and one of the leading business schools worldwide.

History
The merger was announced on June 30, 2009, and they now form a single non-profit organization confirmed by their respective governing bodies (the General Assembly of the French Riviera Chamber of Commerce and the Board of Directors of ESC Lille). The official ceremony and announcement of the new name took place November 16, 2009. CERAM Business School and ESC Lille were respectively founded in 1963 by the French Riviera Chamber of Commerce and in 1892 by Lille Chamber of Commerce.
The new school name, SKEMA, is derived from the Greek, skhêma (shape, figure, formation of an object) meaning schema in Latin. It also stands for the initial letters of "School of Knowledge Economy and Management".

The consolidated schools is now one of the largest French business schools in the number of students (8,500), seventh in number of teachers (166) and sixth in terms of budget.

Since its beginnings in 2009 as a result of the merger between ESC Lille and CERAM Business School, SKEMA has been a global business school with the same ambition for its French and international campuses: to train mobile and adaptable leaders and managers, able to contribute to the knowledge economy and generate sustainable performance with an appreciation for the values and challenges of society, the environment and the economy.

Grande école degrees 
SKEMA Business School is a grande école, a French institution of higher education that is separate from, but parallel and often connected to, the main framework of the French public university system. Grandes écoles are elite academic institutions that admit students through an extremely competitive process, and a significant proportion of their graduates occupy the highest levels of French society. Similar to Ivy League schools in the United States, Oxbridge in the UK, and C9 League in China, graduation from a grande école is considered the prerequisite credential for any top government, administrative and corporate position in France.

The degrees are accredited by the Conférence des Grandes Écoles and awarded by the Ministry of National Education (France). Higher education business degrees in France are organized into three levels thus facilitating international mobility: the Licence / Bachelor's degrees, and the Master's and Doctorat degrees. The Bachelors and the Masters are organized in semesters: 6 for the Bachelors and 4 for the Masters. Those levels of study include various "parcours" or paths based on UE (Unités d'enseignement or Modules), each worth a defined number of European credits (ECTS). A student accumulates those credits, which are generally transferable between paths. A Bachelors is awarded once 180 ECTS have been obtained (bac + 3); a Masters is awarded once 120 additional credits have been obtained (bac +5). The highly coveted PGE (Grand Ecole Program) ends with the degree of Master's in Management (MiM)

Campuses
SKEMA has opened several international campuses. It has three campuses in France in Lille, Paris and Sophia Antipolis near Nice, and campuses in China (Suzhou), Brazil (Belo Horizonte) and the USA (Raleigh, North Carolina, in partnership with North Carolina State University). Lille and Sophia Antipolis campuses are the historic locations of the ESC Lille and CERAM Business School.

In May 2019 the school announced the upcoming opening of its new Grand Paris campus in Suresnes. Previously occupied by Airbus, it spreads across  comprising 40 classrooms and two large lecture halls. This campus will also have a rooftop of 1,600m², a co-working space and a student residence. It has opened in January 2021

Skema announced the opening of a new campus in Cape Town (South Africa) at the beginning of academic year 2019/2020. 

The Lille campus is located in the Euralille business district in the north of France. The Lille campus gathers more than 2,200 students over 16,000 m2. A partnership has been established with the University of Lille to develop joint-programmes and combine the institutions' research efforts in the Lille School of Management Research Center.

The Sophia Antipolis campus is located in the technology park of the same name in the south of France. A partnership with Science Po Aix offers joint-programmes, enabling business students to study political sciences.

Rankings

Financial Times rankings：

2022, Masters in Management program ranked 41st in the world.

2021, MSc Financial Markets & Investments ranked 3rd globally.

The Economist ranking：

2021. MSc International Business ranked 5th worldwide.

Forbes ranking：

2019, MBA ranked among the 12 best Executive MBA programmes.

2020, MSc Entrepreneurship & Innovation ranked among the 10 best entrepreneurial programmes.

SKEMA is double-accredited – Equis EFMD Accredited EMBA and AACSB. Its programmes are recognised in France (Visa, Master's degree, RNCP, CGE label), as well as in the USA (licensing), Brazil (certificação) and China.

Research 

SKEMA has several research centers and a unit for entrepreneurship and innovation.
FAIRR (Finance and Accounting Insights on Risk and Regulation)
KTO (Knowledge, Technology and Organization)
MINT (Marketing Interactions)
PRISM (PRoject Information and Supply Management)
RISE² (Reflections and Research In International Strategy Sustainability Entrepreneurship and Economics)
ThinkForward - a regular podcast that covers business topics.
SKEMA Ventures - a business unit dedicated to entrepreneurship and innovation. Through teaching, coaching, incubation and acceleration, this unit helps SKEMA students and alumni  think, design, test and launch an entrepreneurial business/project in a global context. Faculty facilitate and stimulate the generation of ideas and assists entrepreneurs in the construction, launching, and development of their business/project. Entrepreneurs also apply their knowledge at events such as the StarTonic Weekend, Bootstrap, Bootcamp, Booster and Startup Kafés.
PEPITEs & Incubators - SKEMA partners with French universities to offer PEPITEs (student centers for innovation transfer and entrepreneurship) and grants student-entrepreneur awards: PEPITE PACA-EST Cre@tude; Incubateur PACA-EST (IPE); PEPITE Lille Nord de France; Le Village By CA; and, the incubator Tonic in Lille. In Belo Horizonte, SKEMA has a SEED (Startups and Entrepreneurship Ecosystem Development) accelerator, in China it works with the Crescenders incubator, and in the United States, SKEMA participates in an entrepreneurial clinic / bootcamp co-organized with the North Carolina State.

Programmes

Undergraduate Programmes

SKEMA offers two undergraduate programmes: Bachelor of Business Administration (BBA) in Global Management and Bachelor of Business Administration (BBA) in International Business.

The BBA in Global Management allows students to obtain a double degree - SKEMA's BBA in Global Management degree and (according to the student's choice):

 North Carolina State University (NCSU) bachelor's degree, or
 A bachelor's degree from a partner university in the case of a double-diploma transfer programme, or
 SKEMA's American bachelor's degree in the case of a one-year stay (or more) at the Raleigh campus

SKEMA's BBA in International Business is a four-year degree program that prepares students to succeed in today's global economy and is available at its Raleigh, USA, campus. SKEMA's Raleigh campus gives students the choice to study abroad for one or two years at an international campus. Students have the possibility to return to the US for their fourth year and do their capstone project, or to continue their fourth year abroad to get a double degree or another specialisation.

MSc Programmes 
SKEMA's Master of Science (MSc) programmes are mostly taught over a one-year period and are entirely in English. The one-year MSc programmes are for applicants who have a four-year degree, while the two-year MSc programmes are for those with a three-year university degree. SKEMA Business School offers 18 masters of science programmes covering all major business domains.

They are mainly divided into the following categories: Finance, Marketing, Management, and Business and Strategy.  Recently developed programmes include Digital Business and Digital Marketing and a double diploma partnership with UC Berkeley for Entrepreneurship students.

Master in Management/Grande Ecole Programme 
SKEMA's Master in Management is a two-year multi-campus programme offering a wide range of specialisations and a variety of learning paths. Students can choose to study either in French or English and get the change to study abroad at one of SKEMA's international campuses in China, Brazil and the US, besides France.

Other features include:

 Between 12 and 24 months’ experience in a company
 Innovative teaching and learning: six interdisciplinary teaching and learning projects and targeted, appropriate use of e-learning and m-learning teaching methods
 Specific focus on management in the knowledge economy

PhD, Doctoral equivalences
SKEMA offers the equivalent doctoral programmes: PhD in Finance and Accounting, KTO PhD In Management, Doctorate of Business Administration (DBA) in Project and Programme Management and Digital DBA.

Executive MBA Programme
SKEMA Business School's Global Executive Master in Business Administration (GEMBA) is for experienced executives wishing to increase their managerial and strategic skills in an international environment. The Global EMBA allows participants to develop a global and innovative strategic vision in today's complex, unpredictable and interconnected world. This programme is a real springboard to help executives achieve strategic missions inside their company, reorient their career path or  launch their own business.

The programme delivers twelve core modules offering a general understanding of the key business functions of companies and general managerial skills as well as two optional specialisations: Project Management and Entrepreneurship & Innovation.

Summer Schools
SKEMA offers two short programmes in Paris during the summer:The programmes are Finance and Banking and Project Management.

Student unions
65 student societies are present at the   school in the fields of art, culture, business, environment, humanitarian and social aid, high tech, sport, student life, and international.

Interculture SKEMA and S'Konnection are the 2 main student unions in charge of welcoming international students from all across the world. They represent the open-minded spirit of the school.

Skema Conseil is a Junior Entreprise, student consultancy society, providing services to entrepreuners and firms. The society is present on Sophia Antipolis (French Riviera), Paris and Lille. SKEMA Conseil was elected "Best Junior Entreprise of 2012"

AIESEC, autonomous organization, with headquarters located at Montreal, has several local offices in the Lille and Sophia-Antipolis campuses for Skema students.

Notable alumni
CNIL Warning - Private Data protection !
Prince Joel Dawit Makonnen, Ethiopian prince
Louis Ducruet (1992), son of Princess Stéphanie of Monaco, singer and Daniel Ducruet, driver and Nephew of Albert II, Prince of Monaco
Yannick Agnel, former French swimmer and Olympic medalist
Jean-Philippe Courtois, Executive Vice President and President, Microsoft Global Sales, Marketing and Operations.
, CEO of Nexity
Jacques Stern, ex-CEO of Edenred
, former chairman of  
Loïc Bruni, professional downhill mountain biker
Nathalie Bricker, IAE MSTCF, CFO of Natixis
Philippe Batchevitch, Deputy CEO Fixed Income of Amundi
Harvesh Seegolam, Governor of Bank of Mauritius and former Chief Executive at Financial Services Commission (Mauritius)
Jimmy Adjovi-Boco former international soccer player and member of Presidential Council for Africa
Grégory Sanson, CFO of Bonduelle
Joannes Soënen, CEO of 
Franck Bonin, CEO of Société Générale Private Banking Suisse
Guillaume Ladis, Deputy CEO and CFO of BofA Securities Europe
Kjerstin Braathen, CEO of DNB
Benoit Le Sech, CFO of Paris Saint-Germain F.C.
Jean-Claude Blanc, General manager and marketing executive of Paris Saint-Germain F.C. and former CEO of Juventus Football Club
Michaël Youn, French Comedian
Michal Izdinsky, Olympian water polo player
Hervé Rogeau, ex-chairman of the management board at  merged with SG
Leonid Shafirov, Russian financier and public figure
, world champion of Taekwondo and public figure
Marilyne Boulaie, CFO at Archer Daniels Midland
Jurriaen Sleijster, president and COO of MCI Group
Laurent Uberti, CEO of Sitel
Christophe Barnouin, CEO of Royal Wessanen
Bernard Muselet, chairman of the management board at 
Christophe Cornu, IMD Lausanne, CEO at Nestlé France
Anna Radmacher, president APAC Weber-Stephen Products
Guillaume Bidan, former president and CEO of General Electric Central America
Dimitri Gouten, CEO at Buccellati Asia Pacific
Julien Hemard, CCO at Pernod Ricard China
Pierre-Eric Cohade, Governor at American Chamber of Commerce in Hong Kong and Chairman of IMA India. Also holds several director positions at e.g. Deutsche Bank (China). Former CEO of Triangle Group and speaker at World Economic Forum
Régis Degelcke, president of Eurocommerce and former Chairman of Auchan
Edouard Roquette, chairman of the family business board at Roquette Frères
Géraldine Le Meur, entrepreneur and business executive
Olivier Dufour, executive director at PageGroup Belgium
Antoine Jouteau, Université Paris-Dauphine, CEO of 
Ludovic Holinier, CEO of Cora (hypermarket) and former Executive Chairman of Auchan (China)
Mathile Saint-Pol Cousteix, COO at Rigby Group Capital Europe
Vallese Lydie, chief risk officer at BNP Paribas Securities Services
Jean-Luc Alfonsi, president at Helibras
Mehdi Slimani, CFO at Le Coq Sportif
Guillaume de Blic, CEO Western Europe at Lacoste
Bruno Coquet, Phd economics Aix Marseille, economist and policymaker for the French Government and the European Union
Akim Daouda, Chief Investment Officer at the Gabonese Strategic Investment Fund.  Young Global Leader at the World Economic Forum
Walid Issa, CFO of Banque Libano-Française S.A.L.
Dominique Derveaux, COO at 
Mathilde Thomas, co-founder with Bertrand Thomas (ESSEC) of Caudalie and Knight in the Legion of Honour
Julie Kitcher, Communication Executive Vice President at Airbus
Yves Morieux, IEP Paris, director at Boston Consulting Group
Stefano Gori, head of international relations at Poste Italiane and former working group member at World Economic Forum
Erwan Gelebart, CEO of JazzCash
Jean Claude Bacos, general manager France and head APAC of Bayer Pharmaceuticals
Marc Bayle de Jessé, Pace University, CEO of CLS Group and former chairman of the Market Infrastructure Board at the European Central Bank
Thani Ahmed Al-Zeyoudi, Minister of Climate Change and Environment for the United Arab Emirates
Anthony Ledru, CEO of Tiffany & Co.

References

External links
International official website
French official website

Grandes écoles
Educational institutions established in 2009
Business schools in China
Business schools in France
Business schools in Morocco
Business schools in North Carolina
Universities and colleges in the Research Triangle
Education in Paris
Education in Lille
Universities and colleges in Raleigh, North Carolina
2009 establishments in France